Thomas White (by 1500 – 1542) was an English politician.

He was a Member (MP) of the Parliament of England for Bristol in 1539.

References

1542 deaths
English MPs 1539–1540
Year of birth uncertain